Cambridge HC is a handball club from Cambridge, England, which has a men's team in the Super 8 and a women's team in Women's Super 8

European record

Team

Current squad 
Squad for the 2016–17 season

Goalkeepers
 Graham Jack
 Pierre Larraufie 

Wingers
RW
  Tobias Barber
  Kevin Guy
  Thibaut Page
LW 
  Antonio Pedro Albuquerque
 
Rickie Bailey
  Oliver Holway 
Line players 
  Alejandro Garcia Costa
  Levente Kovacs
  Jean-Daniel Malcor

Back players
LB
  Zsolt Majoros 
CB 
  Jose Ballester Beltran
  Francisco De Almeida Seco 
  Nicolas Martin 
RB
  Fernando Gicci
  Jürgen Harter
  Florian Ströhl

External links
Official website

Cambridge HC